Detective was an American/English rock band, that toured and recorded in the late 1970s.  Detective consisted of vocalist Michael Des Barres, guitarist Michael Monarch, bassist Bobby Pickett (not the 1960s singer of the same name), ex-Yes keyboardist Tony Kaye, and drummer Jon Hyde.  The band released two albums, Detective (produced by the band, Andy Johns and Jimmy Robinson) and It Takes One to Know One in 1977, as well as Live From The Atlantic Studios, a promotional album recorded in 1978 for radio broadcast, in 1978.

"They were good," recalled Jimmy Page of Led Zeppelin, on whose Swan Song label Detective debuted. "That first album of theirs, it was really good. It should have been more popular, shouldn't it?"

In support of their second album,  It Takes One To Know One,  Detective toured as the support act for Kiss.  Kiss liked Detective so much that they considered recording one of their songs, "Ain't None Of Your Business",  with Peter Criss on lead vocals. Demos exist of the Kiss version, but the song was never released on a Kiss album, nor was it ever played live.

Detective went into the studio in 1978 with producer, Tom Dowd, to record their third album. While their first two albums were on Led Zeppelin's Swan Song label,  Atlantic Records took over the band for their third release.  Atlantic wanted a hit single from the band. Dowd brought in a song from a then unknown singer-songwriter named John Cougar, "I Need a Lover".  According to Monarch, they did not want to record it, but agreed.  It remains unreleased to this day, along with a couple of original songs.  Monarch later said that the members of Detective were moving in different directions and the group decided to disband.

Michael Des Barres performed songs on the fourth episode of the first season of the sitcom WKRP in Cincinnati, as part of the fictional hoodlum rock group "Scum of the Earth". Des Barres (who played "Sir Charles Weatherbee" aka "Dog") and two other actors (Peter Elbling, as "Blood", and Jim Henderson, as "Nigel") played the part of the band during most of the TV show, and Detective performed at the end of the show segment.

Discography

Detective (Swan Song Records, 1977)
U.S. No. 135
Track Listing
 "Recognition" - (Michael Des Barres, Pamela Des Barres, Michael Monarch) - 4:27
 "Got Enough Love" - (M. Des Barres, P. Des Barres, Monarch) - 3:59
 "Grim Reaper" - (M. Des Barres, Monarch, Bobby Pickett, Jon Hyde) - 4:10
 "Nightingale" - (Monarch, Hyde) - 4:54
 "Detective Man" - (Monarch,  Hyde) - 3:25
 "Ain't None Of Your Business" - (Lew Anderson, Becky Hobbs) 4:29
 "Deep Down" - (Monarch, Pickett) - 3:06
 "Wild Hot Summer Nights" - (Monarch, Hyde) - 4:17
 "One More Heartache" - (Monarch, Hyde) - 5:22
Personnel
 Michael Des Barres - lead vocals
 Michael Monarch - guitars
 Tony Kaye - keyboards
 Bobby Pickett - bass, backing vocals
 Jon Hyde - drums, backing vocals, percussion

It Takes One to Know One (Swan Song Records, 1977)
U.S. No. 103
Track Listing
 "Help Me Up" - (Hyde) - 4:14
 "Competition" - (Michael Des Barres, Pamela Des Barres, Monarch, Kaye) - 4:34
 "Are You Talkin' To Me?"- (M. Des Barres, Monarch) - 4:35
 "Dynamite" - (Monarch, Hyde) - 5:25
 "Something Beautiful" - (M. Des Barres) - 4:19
 "Warm Love" - (Monarch, Hyde) - 5:24
 "Betcha Won't Dance" - (M. Des Barres, Bobby Pickett) - 4:24
 "Fever" - (Monarch, Pickett, Hyde) - 4:40
 "Tear Jerker" - (Monarch, Kaye, Hyde) - 4:30
Personnel
 Michael Des Barres - lead vocals
 Michael Monarch - guitars
 Tony Kaye - keyboards
 Bobby Pickett - bass, backing vocals
 Jon Hyde - drums, backing vocals, percussion

Live from the Atlantic Studios (1978)
Track listing
 "Help Me Up" - (Jon Hyde) - 5:21
 "Got Enough Love" - (Michael Des Barres, Pamela Des Barres, Michael Monarch) - 4:46
 "Recognition" - (M. Des Barres, P. Des Barres, Monarch) - 5:22
 "One More Heartache" - (Monarch, Hyde) - 8:57
 "Detective Man" - (Monarch,  Hyde) - 4:31
 "Grim Reaper" - (M. Des Barres, Monarch, Bobby Pickett, Hyde) - 5:20
 "Fever" - (Monarch, Pickett, Hyde) - 5:35
 "Nightingale" - (Monarch, Hyde) - 5:49
 "Tear Jerker / Good Rockin' Tonight" - (Monarch, Kaye, Hyde / Roy Brown) - 5:41

Personnel
 Michael Des Barres - lead vocals
 Michael Monarch - guitar
 Tony Kaye - keyboards
 Bobby Pickett - bass, backing vocals
 Jon Hyde - drums, percussion

References

American hard rock musical groups
Swan Song Records artists